Slocum Lake may refer to:

A lake in Lake County, Illinois
An alternative name for Murphy Lake (Newaygo County, Michigan)